Kövdadıq (also Kevdadykh) is a village in the Tartar Rayon of Azerbaijan.  The village forms part of the municipality of Rəcəbli.

References 

Populated places in Tartar District